El honorable Señor Valdez, is a Mexican telenovela produced by Valentín Pimstein for Televisa in 1973. It was starring Ignacio López Tarso and María Elena Marqués.

Plot 
Humberto Valdez is an intelligent man and father of a beautiful family, but it is tyrannical and sexist character. He is married to Sara and has two beautiful children: Rosalba and Jesús. Humberto against others pretending to be a "honorable" man, but besides its illicit maneuvers at work keeps an affair with a younger woman, Andrea. But gradually the fearsome and imposing figure of the "honorable Sr. Valdez" will break when his double life and discover their dirty business, which not only bring trouble with the law but will entail rejection and repudiation of people and his own family.

Cast 
Ignacio López Tarso as Humberto Valdez
María Elena Marqués as Sara Valdez
Nadia Milton as Rosalba Valdez
Fernando Larrañaga as Jesús Valdez
Jorge Lavat as Esteban
Irma Lozano as Martha
Fernando Borges as Miguel
Sonia Amelio as Lola
Raúl "Chato" Padilla as Don Carlos
Josefina Escobedo as Sra. Solís
Justo Martínez as Tiburcio
Anel as Andrea

References 

1973 telenovelas
1970s Mexican television series
1973 Mexican television series debuts
1973 Mexican television series endings
Mexican telenovelas
Spanish-language telenovelas
Televisa telenovelas